D mt  (Ge'ez: ደዐመተ, DʿMT theoretically vocalized as ዳዓማት, Daʿamat or ዳዕማት, Daʿəmat) was a kingdom located in Eritrea and northern Ethiopia that existed between the 10th and 5th centuries BC. Few inscriptions by or about this kingdom survive and very little archaeological work has taken place. As a result, it is not known whether Dʿmt ended as a civilization before the Kingdom of Aksum's early stages, evolved into the Aksumite state, or was one of the smaller states united in the Kingdom of Aksum possibly around the beginning of the 1st century.

History
Given the presence of a large temple complex, the capital of Dʿmt may have been present day Yeha, in Tigray Region, Ethiopia. At Yeha, the temple to the god Ilmuqah is still standing.

The kingdom developed irrigation schemes, used plows, grew millet, and made iron tools and weapons.

Some modern historians including Stuart Munro-Hay, Rodolfo Fattovich, Ayele Bekerie, Cain Felder, and Ephraim Isaac consider this civilization to be indigenous, although Sabaean-influenced due to the latter's dominance of the Red Sea, while others like Joseph Michels, Henri de Contenson, Tekle-Tsadik Mekouria, and Stanley Burstein have viewed Dʿmt as the result of a mixture of Sabaeans and indigenous peoples. Some sources consider the  Sabaean influence to be minor, limited to a few localities, and disappeared after a few decades or a century, perhaps representing a trading or military colony in some sort of symbiosis or military alliance with the civilization of Dʿmt or some other proto-Aksumite state.

Archaeologist Rodolfo Fattovich believed that there was a division in the population of Dʿmt and northern Ethiopia due to the kings ruling over the 'sb (Sabaeans) and the 'br, the 'Reds' and the 'Blacks'. Fattovich also noted that the known kings of Dʿmt worshipped both South Arabian and indigenous gods named 'str, Hbs, Dt Hmn, Rb, Šmn, Ṣdqn and Šyhn.

After the fall of Dʿmt in the 5th century BC, the plateau came to be dominated by smaller unknown successor kingdoms. This lasted until the rise of one of these polities during the first century BC, the Aksumite Kingdom.

Name
Due to the similarity of the name of Dʿmt and Damot when transcribed into Latin characters, these two kingdoms are often confused or conflated with one another, but there is no evidence of any relationship to Damot, a kingdom far to the south and existing a millennium and a half later.

Known rulers
The following is a list of four known rulers of Dʿmt, in chronological order:

Regions 

 Barka
 Bur
 Hamasien
 Marya
 Seraye
 Yeha

See also
History of Eritrea
History of Ethiopia
Kingdom of Aksum
Land of Punt

References

 
Countries in ancient Africa
5th-century BC disestablishments
States and territories established in the 8th century BC
States and territories disestablished in the 5th century BC
8th-century BC establishments
Former kingdoms